The Roman Catholic Diocese of Jacarezinho is a diocese in the city of Jacarezinho in the Ecclesiastical province of Londrina in Brazil.

History
 May 10, 1926: Established as Diocese of Jacarezinho from the Diocese of Curitiba

Bishops
 Bishops of Jacarezinho (Roman rite), in reverse chronological order
 Bishop Antônio Braz Benevente (7 September 2010 – present)
 Bishop Fernando José Penteado (5 July 2000 – 23 June 2010)
 Bishop Conrado Walter, S.A.C. (10 August 1991 – 5 July 2000)
 Bishop Pedro Filipak (8 February 1962 – 10 August 1991)
 Bishop Geraldo de Proença Sigaud, S.V.D. (later Archbishop) (29 October 1946 – 20 December 1960), appointed Archbishop of Diamantina, Minas Gerais
 Bishop Ernesto de Paula (22 November 1941 – 30 June 1945), appointed Bishop of Piracicaba, São Paulo
 Bishop Fernando Taddei, C.M. (22 April 1927 – 9 January 1940)

Coadjutor bishop
Conrado Walter, S.A.C. (1984-1991)

Auxiliary bishop
Conrado Walter, S.A.C. † (1977-1984), appointed Coadjutor here

Other priests of this diocese who became bishops
Mauro Aparecido dos Santos, appointed Coadjutor Bishop of Campo Mourão, Parana in 1998
Elizeu de Morais Pimentel, appointed Coadjutor Bishop of Paranavaí, Parana in 2001
Mário Antônio da Silva, appointed Auxiliary Bishop of Manaus, Amazonas in 2010

References
 GCatholic.org
 Catholic Hierarchy

Roman Catholic dioceses in Brazil
Christian organizations established in 1926
Jacarezinho, Roman Catholic Diocese of
Roman Catholic dioceses and prelatures established in the 20th century
Jacarezinho, Paraná